This is a list of notable people who were born, or who have lived in Lancaster County, Pennsylvania.

 William Addams (1777–1858), U.S. representative 
 David Hayes Agnew (1818–1892), surgeon
 Chas Alecxih, NFL defensive lineman
 Andy Baldwin, U.S. Navy lieutenant and physician, bachelor of season 10 of The Bachelor
 James Buchanan (1791–1868), 15th President of the United States
 Thomas Burch (1778–1849), Methodist circuit rider
 Simon Cameron (1799–1889), Secretary of War
 Miles B. Carpenter (1889–1985), sculptor
 Diane Cluck, singer-songwriter
 Lewis Cohen, playing card manufacturer
 Adam Cole, professional wrestler
 Michael Deibert, journalist, author
 Charles Demuth (1883–1935), painter
 Jon Dough (born Chet Anuszak), born in Lancaster 
 William Duchman (1809–1881), Wisconsin state legislator and sawmill operator
 Gretchen Egolf, actress, sister of Tristan Egolf
 Tristan Egolf (1971–2005), novelist, author, activist
 Andrew Ellicott (1754–1820), surveyor
 Michael Erlewine, founder of All Media Guide (AMG)
 Andrew J. Feustel, NASA astronaut
 FFH, Contemporary Christian band
 Robert Fulton (1765–1815), engineer, inventor, creator of Clermont steamboat
 Jim Furyk, professional golfer
 Cam Gallagher, professional baseball player 
 Gene Garber, Major League Baseball relief pitcher
 Jennifer Gareis, actress and 1994 Miss New York
 Lewis E. Gettle, Wisconsin State Assemblyman and lawyer
 Matt Greiner, drummer of metalcore band August Burns Red
 Jonathan Groff, actor and singer who originated role of "Melchior" in the Broadway musical Spring Awakening
 Klaus Grutzka (1923–2011), industrial artist
 Edward Hand (1744–1802), physician, farmer, congressman, general officer in Continental Army during American Revolutionary War
 Tom Herr, MLB second baseman
 Milton S. Hershey (1857–1945), chocolatier, founder of the Hershey Company
 S. Dale High, chairman of High Industries
 Rev.Earl Honaman (1904–1982), Suffragan Bishop of the Episcopal Diocese of Central Pennsylvania 
 The Innocence Mission, band from Lancaster (performed the hit song "Bright as Yellow")
 Travis Jankowski, professional baseball player
 Taylor Kinney, actor and model
 Maria Louise Kirk, painter and illustrator 
 Dan Kreider, NFL fullback
 Floyd Landis, professional road bicycle racer
 D. Ross Lederman (1894–1972), film director
 Frank B. McClain (1864–1925), Mayor of Lancaster(24th), Pennsylvania, Lt Gov State of Pennsylvania (1914)
 Alexander McNair, first Governor of Missouri
 Thomas Mifflin, merchant, politician, governor of Pennsylvania
 Anna Balmer Myers, author of early 20th-century novels centered in Lancaster County
 Clarence Charles Newcomer (1923–2005), United States federal judge
 Karin Olah (born 1977), contemporary painter, collage, and fiber artist
 Amish Outlaws, cover band
 Nguyen Chanh Thi (1923–2007), Army of the Republic of Vietnam general, retired to Lancaster
 John Parrish, MLB relief pitcher
 Barry Pearl (born 1950), actor
 Molly Picon (1898–1992), actress, died in Lancaster
 John F. Reynolds (1820–1863), U.S. Army major general, American Civil War
 Charles Carl Roberts (1973–2006), gunman in the West Nickel Mines School shooting
 Keegan Rosenberry, professional soccer player, Philadelphia Union 
 Brad Rutter, Jeopardy! champion
 Theodore Emanuel Schmauk (1860–1920), Lutheran theologian, educator
 Frank H. Shaw (1882–1950), civil engineer
 Pete Snyder, founder of New Media Strategies
 Thaddeus Stevens (1792–1868), U.S. representative, Republican 
 John Stockton, Michigan territorial legislator
 Daniel B. Strickler (1897–1992), U.S. Army lieutenant general, lieutenant governor
 Bruce Sutter, Hall of Fame pitcher 
 William G. Thompson, mayor of Detroit, Michigan 1881-83
 Julian Valentin, professional soccer player
 Zarek Valentin, professional soccer player
 Junior Vasquez, New York City club DJ, remixer, producer
 Robert S. Walker, U.S. representative, Republican
 James Weaver, California Angels pitcher
 Andrew Wenger, professional soccer player
 Suzanne Westenhoefer, comedian
 William Whipper (1804–1876), African American businessman, activist
 Charlotte White (1782–1863), first unmarried American female missionary, arrived in India in 1816
 Marianne Wiggins, author
 Kristen Wiig, actress and comedian
 Michael Willis, character actor
 Richard Winters, U.S. Army paratrooper portrayed in Stephen Ambrose's 1992 book and miniseries Band of Brothers

References

External links

Lancaster
 
Pennsylvania culture